Dice 10,000 (or 10000, 10,000 Dice, Ten Grand) also Greed, Dix Mille, 5-Dice is the name of a family dice game played with 6 dice, it is similar or identical to the commercialized Farkle. It also goes by other names, including Zilch, Zilchers, Foo, Boxcar, Bogus, Lewis' Dice and Crap Out.

The Game achieved some level of fame and notoriety during early 2023 due to its extreme rise in popularity throughout London, particularly in the South East.

Scoring
These are the base methods of scoring:
 Single fives are worth 50 points
 Single ones are worth 100 points
 Three of a kind are worth 100 points times the number rolled, except for three ones which are worth 1000 points
 If four, five, or six of a kind are rolled, each additional dice doubles the amount of dice previously rolled. For example, 4 die showing the number 3 would be 600 points and 5 die showing the number 3 would be 1200 points
 This makes the highest possible score in a single roll 8000 for six ones (1000 for three ones, after that player multiplies the roll by two for each additional one in that series of rolling.)
 A straight from 1 to 6 is worth 1500 points. If a player fails to roll a straight, they may make one attempt to complete the straight. If the desired number(s) does not turn up on the next roll, that round is a "crap out" even if there are scoring dice on the table i.e. 1's or 5's.
 Three pairs are worth 1000 points, for instance 2+2, 4+4, 5+5. This rule does not count if you roll a quadruple and a pair e.g. 2+2, 2+2, 6+6 unless stated otherwise (some places have their own house rules).

 Full house (3 of a kind plus 2 of a kind) are worth 1,500
Typically each roll scores separately, with dice scored at the time they are rolled, so that three or more of a kind must be rolled simultaneously, and dice from later rolls do not "stack" for the higher score. In so-called progressive scoring, dice can form combinations with dice previously scored and set aside. Also to add you can not take a full house with 4 of a kind and a 2 of a kind without rolling 1 of the 4 dice to make the full house a 3 of a kind and a 2 of a kind for a full house

Example: Player 1 rolls all six dice, and chooses to score three fours for 400 points. She rolls the remaining three dice for a 2, 4, 5; the additional 4 does not multiply the previous three of a kind unless playing progressive, and she can only score 50 points for the lone 5. If she rolls two more 5's with the remaining dice, if not playing progressive they will only score 50 points each, and do not form a three of a kind with the other 5.

Progressive mode

Separate turns mode, (6 dice)

Rule variations
super greedy dramatic fun variation.
Whatever dice that are left over after completing their turn, are passed to the next player to attempt to steal the points with a 1 or 5. If that player fails to score they are given a strike. 3 strikes and you lose all your points.

Winning
There are two main winning variants, one requires an ''exact'' score of 10,000. The others criteria is that you only have to exceed 10,000.

With playing the exact score, in the event that a player goes over, the score for that turn is lost and they need to try again next turn. If the 10,000 is hit, that player wins immediately without giving the other players a chance to roll. However, in progressive mode if the winner leaves at least one die then the next player may 'roll off the score'.

The first player to score over 10,000 points temporarily becomes the winner, and each other player gets one more turn to top that player's score. Whoever ends with the highest score wins the game.

A rule variation states that if a player rolls all 6 dice with the same number they instantly win. This is part of another ruleset which allows rolling dices off other players.

Related games 
 Cosmic Wimpout
 Farkle (see article for more information on scoring variations and probabilities)
 Greed
 Zonk

Dice games